The 2008 Millsaps Majors football team represented Millsaps College during the 2008 college football season. The 2008 season was a very successful season. The Majors rolled through the regular season, going 10-0 and outscoring their opponents 442 to 132. The team avenged 2007's crushing loses at the hands of Mississippi College and Trinity, pummeling the Choctaws 42-6 in the eighth edition of the renewed Backyard Brawl and punishing the Tigers 56-27 in San Antonio.

The Majors captured their third consecutive SCAC championship, winning outright to earn the program's third NCAA tournament berth, became the first team in the program's history to reach double digit wins and climbed to their highest ever national ranking, #3, before finishing the season 11-1 and ranked #12 nationally.

Once again, DuBose was named the conference's "Coach of the Year" and senior quarterback Juan Joseph was the SCAC's "Offensive Player of the Year" for the third consecutive season. Sophomore wide receiver and return specialist Michael Galatas was named the conference's "Special Teams Player of the Year" and freshman running back Shane Bowser was the SCAC's co-"Newcomer of the Year." In all, 20 Majors were named to the All-SCAC first team, second team and honorable mention lists.

Schedule

References

Millsaps
Millsaps Majors football seasons
Millsaps Majors football